Marilia Gomes de Souza, née Mattos (born ) is a retired Brazilian female artistic gymnast who represented her nation in international competitions.  She participated at the 1999 World Artistic Gymnastics Championships in Tianjin, China.

References

1982 births
Living people
Sportspeople from São Paulo
Brazilian female artistic gymnasts
Gymnasts at the 1999 Pan American Games
Pan American Games bronze medalists for Brazil
Pan American Games medalists in gymnastics
South American Games gold medalists for Brazil
South American Games silver medalists for Brazil
South American Games bronze medalists for Brazil
South American Games medalists in gymnastics
Competitors at the 1998 South American Games
Medalists at the 1999 Pan American Games
20th-century Brazilian women
21st-century Brazilian women